The Protocol on Prohibitions or Restrictions on the use of Incendiary Weapons is a United Nations treaty that restricts the use of incendiary weapons. It is Protocol III to the 1980 Convention on Certain Conventional Weapons Which May Be Deemed To Be Excessively Injurious Or To Have Indiscriminate Effects. Concluded in 1981, it entered into force on 2 December 1983. , it had been ratified by 126 state parties.

Incendiary weapons as a category does not appear to include thermobaric weapons, and international law does not appear to prohibit the use of thermobaric munitions, fuel-air explosive devices, or vacuum bombs against military targets. Their use against civilian populations or infrastructure may be banned by this Protocol. , all past attempts to regulate or restrict thermobaric weapons have failed.

Content

The protocol prohibits, in all circumstances, making the civilian population as such, individual civilians or civilian objects, the object of attack by any weapon or munition which is primarily designed to set fire to objects or to cause burn injury to persons through the action of flame, heat or a combination thereof, produced by a chemical reaction of a substance delivered on the target. The protocol also prohibits the use of air-delivered incendiary weapons against military targets within a concentration of civilians, and limits the use of incendiary weapons delivered by other means. Forest and other plants may not be a target unless they are used to conceal combatants or other military objectives.

The protocol lists certain munition types like smoke shells which only have a secondary or additional incendiary effect; these munition types are not considered to be incendiary weapons.

Review of doctrine
An investigation into the doctrine taught by various militaries was conducted sometime after 2001 by the International Committee of the Red Cross as part of its database on Customary International Humanitarian Law. Rule 84 deals with this Protocol.

History
The Armed Forces of the Russian Federation used incendiary weapons in the Battle of Grozny (1999–2000). Pavel Felgenhauer, at the time a journalist of the Moscow Times, reported that:

External links
Text and signatories of the protocol

References

Incendiary weapons
International humanitarian law treaties
United Nations treaties
Convention on Certain Conventional Weapons
Treaties concluded in 1981
Treaties entered into force in 1983
Treaties of Albania
Treaties of Algeria
Treaties of Antigua and Barbuda
Treaties of Argentina
Treaties of Australia
Treaties of Austria
Treaties of Bahrain
Treaties of Bangladesh
Treaties of Belarus
Treaties of Benin
Treaties of Belgium
Treaties of Bolivia
Treaties of Bosnia and Herzegovina
Treaties of Brazil
Treaties of Bulgaria
Treaties of Burkina Faso
Treaties of Cambodia
Treaties of Canada
Treaties of Cape Verde
Treaties of Chile
Treaties of China
Treaties of Colombia
Treaties of Costa Rica
Treaties of Croatia
Treaties of Cuba
Treaties of Cyprus
Treaties of the Czech Republic
Treaties of Denmark
Treaties of Djibouti
Treaties of Ecuador
Treaties of El Salvador
Treaties of Estonia
Treaties of Finland
Treaties of France
Treaties of Gabon
Treaties of Georgia (country)
Treaties of Germany
Treaties of Greece
Treaties of Grenada
Treaties of Guatemala
Treaties of Guinea-Bissau
Treaties of the Holy See
Treaties of Honduras
Treaties of Hungary
Treaties of Iceland
Treaties of India
Treaties of Ireland
Treaties of Italy
Treaties of Jamaica
Treaties of Japan
Treaties of Jordan
Treaties of Kazakhstan
Treaties of Kuwait
Treaties of Laos
Treaties of Latvia
Treaties of Lesotho
Treaties of Liberia
Treaties of Liechtenstein
Treaties of Lithuania
Treaties of Luxembourg
Treaties of North Macedonia
Treaties of Madagascar
Treaties of the Maldives
Treaties of Mali
Treaties of Malta
Treaties of Mauritius
Treaties of Mexico
Treaties of Moldova
Treaties of Mongolia
Treaties of Montenegro
Treaties of Nauru
Treaties of the Netherlands
Treaties of New Zealand
Treaties of Nicaragua
Treaties of Niger
Treaties of Norway
Treaties of Pakistan
Treaties of the State of Palestine
Treaties of Panama
Treaties of Paraguay
Treaties of Peru
Treaties of the Philippines
Treaties of Poland
Treaties of Portugal
Treaties of Qatar
Treaties of Romania
Treaties of Russia
Treaties of Saint Vincent and the Grenadines
Treaties of Saudi Arabia
Treaties of Senegal
Treaties of Serbia
Treaties of Seychelles
Treaties of Sierra Leone
Treaties of Slovakia
Treaties of Slovenia
Treaties of South Africa
Treaties of Spain
Treaties of Sri Lanka
Treaties of Sweden
Treaties of Switzerland
Treaties of Tajikistan
Treaties of Togo
Treaties of Tunisia
Treaties of Uganda
Treaties of Ukraine
Treaties of the United Kingdom
Treaties of the United States
Treaties of Uruguay
Treaties of Venezuela
Treaties of Zambia